Wu Di was the defending champion but lost in the first round to Tommy Paul.

Chung Hyeon won the title after defeating Taro Daniel 7–6(7–3), 6–1 in the final.

Seeds

Draw

Finals

Top half

Bottom half

References
Main Draw
Qualifying Draw

Tennis Championships of Maui - Singles